A spirit safe or intermediate spirit receiver is an enclosed device used in the distillation of Scotch whisky. The distillate from the still passes into it, and can be seen through the glass sides or windows, but cannot be directly accessed. The distiller can analyse the spirit inside the device, and decide where it should be sent.

References 

Whisky
Distillation